Panteg Cemetery is one of the four main cemeteries in the Borough of Torfaen in Wales (the other three are found in Blaenavon, Llwyncelyn and Cwmbran.) The cemetery covers an area of approximately 20 acres. The first interment took place on July 23, 1906. There is a Garden of Remembrance located within the cemetery.

Location 
The cemetery is directly accessed from the main road, The Highway, which runs from the Turnpike (the colloquial local name for the junction of Usk Road and The Highway) and down through the village of New Inn. The cemetery is bordered to the north by the Monmouthshire & Brecon Canal, on the east by the A4042 dual carriageway, to the south by the Coed-y-Cando housing estate, and on the west by the Highway road.

The cemetery has a memorial to 156 people who died during the First World War. There are also 37 recognised Commonwealth War Graves within the cemetery, 16 from the First World War and 21 from the Second World War.

Notable interments
 Edward Thomas Chapman, awarded the Victoria Cross.

References

External links
 Photograph of Panteg Cemetery Chapel and War memorial 
 Commonwealth War Graves Commission cemetery report

Cemeteries in Wales
Commonwealth War Graves Commission cemeteries in Wales